Basta railway station is a railway station on the South Eastern Railway network in the state of Odisha, India. It serves Basta village. Its code is BTS. It has three platforms. Passenger, Express and Superfast trains halt at Basta railway station.

Major trains

 Kalinga Utkal Express
 Sri Jagannath Express
 Dhauli Express
 East Coast Express
 Simlipal Intercity Express

See also
 Balasore district

References

Railway stations in Balasore district
Kharagpur railway division